Mount Olivet Cemetery may refer to:

In Canada:
 Mount Olivet Cemetery (Halifax), Nova Scotia

In the United States:

 Mount Olivet Cemetery (Wheat Ridge, Colorado)
 Mount Olivet Cemetery (Chicago), Illinois
 Mount Olivet Cemetery (Dubuque, Iowa)
Mt. Olivet Episcopal Church and Cemetery, Pineville, Louisiana, listed on the National Register of Historic Places (NRHP)
 Mount Olivet Cemetery (Baltimore), Maryland 
 Mount Olivet Cemetery (Frederick, Maryland)
 Mount Olivet Cemetery (Detroit), Michigan
 Mount Olivet Cemetery (Saginaw), Michigan
 Mount Olivet Cemetery (Middletown, New Jersey)
 Mount Olivet Cemetery (Newark)
 Mount Olivet Cemetery (Queens), New York
 Mount Olivet Cemetery (Tonawanda), New York
 Mount Olivet Cemetery (Hanover, Pennsylvania)
Mt. Olivet Cemetery (Jackson, Tennessee), NRHP-listed in Madison County
 Mount Olivet Cemetery (Nashville), Tennessee, NRHP-listed
 Mount Olivet Cemetery (Fort Worth, Texas)
 Mount Olivet Cemetery (Salt Lake City), Utah
 Mount Olivet Cemetery (Washington, D.C.)
 Mount Olivet Cemetery (Janesville, Wisconsin) 
 Mount Olivet Cemetery (Milwaukee), Wisconsin